The FSV Frankfurt II was a German association football club from the town of Frankfurt, Hesse. It was the reserve team of FSV Frankfurt.

Until 2005 the team played as FSV Frankfurt Amateure during the times the senior side played in professional football. During the times the first time was outside professional football and permanently since 2005 the team played under the name of FSV Frankfurt II. The team's greatest success has been a championship in the Hessenliga in 2010 which took the club up to Regionalliga level for three seasons. At the end of the 2013–14 season the team was disbanded after a rule change that freed professional clubs from having to field a reserve side.

History
Playing at regional amateur level FSV Frankfurt II first rose to higher league levels in 1985 when it won promotion to the tier four Landesliga Hessen-Süd, at a time when the senior team had dropped out of professional football two years earlier. It was relegated from this league after only one season and disappeared into regional football again.

The team made a return to Landesliga level in 2005 and won the league in 2008–09, the first season after it had been renamed to Verbandsliga. In the Hessenliga for the first time FSV Frankfurt II won this league as well in 2010 and earned promotion to the tier four Regionalliga. It finished in the relegation zone in the Regionalliga Süd in 2010–11 and 2011–12 but was rescued by insolvencies of other clubs in the first instance and by a league reform in the second. The team entered the new Regionalliga Südwest for 2012–13 and finished once more on a relegation spot, now dropping back to the Hessenliga again. It finished fifth in the league in 2013–14 and the team was disbanded at the end of it as professional sides were no longer required to field reserve teams. The mother club had decided to withdraw the side for financial reasons, similar to Eintracht Frankfurt II and Bayer 04 Leverkusen II. 

The management of FSV Frankfurt stated that, since 2008, only one player from the reserve side had managed to advanced to the first team while a much larger number had moved up directly from the under 19 team. Additionally, fielding the reserve side in the Regionalliga had taken up 70 percent of the budged of the club's academy while, even at Oberliga level, it still had taken up 55 percent.

Honours
The club's honours:
 Hessenliga (V)
 Champions: 2010
 Verbandsliga Hessen-Süd (VI)
 Champions: 2009
 Bezirksoberliga Frankfurt-West (VI)
 Champions: 2005
 Bezirksliga Frankfurt (VII)
 Champions: 2004

Recent seasons
The recent season-by-season performance of the club:

With the introduction of the Regionalligas in 1994 and the 3. Liga in 2008 as the new third tier, below the 2. Bundesliga, all leagues below dropped one tier. Alongside the introduction of the 3. Liga in 2008, a number of football leagues in Hesse were renamed, with the Oberliga Hessen renamed to Hessenliga, the Landesliga to Verbandsliga, the Bezirksoberliga to Gruppenliga and the Bezirksliga to Kreisoberliga.

Key

References

External links 
 Official team site  
 Das deutsche Fußball-Archiv  Historical German domestic league tables 
 FSV Frankfurt II at Weltfussball.de  

German reserve football teams
Hessian reserve football teams
Football clubs in Frankfurt
II
Association football clubs disestablished in 2014
2014 disestablishments in Germany